is a Japanese paper manufacturing company. The company's stock is listed on the Tokyo and Nagoya Stock Exchange and on the Osaka Securities Exchange. The stock is also constituent of the Nikkei 225 stock index.

As of April 2013 the company has 33 subsidiaries and 11 associate companies.

It is listed as one of the world's top 10 pulp and paper industry companies year-over-year and in 2012 it was sixth in the aforementioned list.

History
 1949 - Jujo Paper Co., Ltd. is founded
 1968 - Jujo Paper merges with Tohoku Pulp Co., Ltd.
 1972 - Sanyo Pulp (established in 1946) merged with Kokusaku Pulp (established in 1938) into Sanyo-Kokusaku Pulp Co., Ltd.
 1993 - Upon merger of Jujo Paper Co., Ltd. and Sanyo-Kokusaku Pulp Co., Ltd., the company is renamed to Nippon Paper Industries
 2001 - Nippon Unipac Holding is formed by the merger of Nippon Paper Industries Co., Ltd. and Daishowa Paper Manufacturing Co., Ltd. (established in 1938) 
 2003 - Both companies' paperboard divisions are merged to form Nippon Daishowa Paperboard
 2004 - Nippon Unipac Holding is renamed to Nippon Paper Group, Inc.
 2009 - Acquired Australian Paper for $700 million.
 2013 - Nippon Paper Group, Inc. merged with Nippon Paper Industries and started operation as Nippon Paper Industries.
 2016 - Nippon Paper has agreed to buy the world's third largest liquids packaging board business from U.S. timber company Weyerhaeuser.

References

External links
 Official website 
 Nippon Paper Industries Annual Report 2017 

 
Pulp and paper companies of Japan
Manufacturing companies established in 1949
Companies listed on the Tokyo Stock Exchange
Companies listed on the Osaka Exchange
Companies listed on the Nagoya Stock Exchange
Japanese brands
Mitsui
1949 establishments in Japan